Running Antelope or Tȟatȟóka Íŋyaŋke (1821–1896) became a head chief of the Húŋkpapȟa in 1851. Known for his bravery in war, and skills in oratory and diplomacy, Running Antelope was one of four Huŋkpapȟa principal chiefs who acted as close advisors to Sitting Bull during the Plains Indian Wars. His belief that compromise with the whites was in their best interests led to his eventually distancing himself from Sitting Bull. He is the only Native American depicted on U.S. paper money, but the picture caused ill will as the Series 1899 $5 Silver Certificate pictured Running Antelope as a chief wearing a Pawnee head dress as the original Sioux head dress was too tall for the engraving.

Early life
When Running Antelope was born near the Grand River, presently South Dakota, in 1821, few white men were in the area. Consequently, he grew up in the old traditions of his people. He learned to ride and hunt, and later went on horse-stealing expeditions and war parties and joined the secret societies. By the time he reached manhood things had changed. The whites were more numerous, and the Native Americans were forced to adapt to the new conditions. Many Sioux took up arms and became strong in warfare; the Hunkpapas, one of the smaller bands of the Tetons, became one of the strongest. Running Antelope, however, was one of the first Hunkpapas to reject the warpath and become a friend of the whites. Running Antelope, in his earlier years, was closely allied with Sitting Bull, who was eleven years his junior. Running Antelope, a band chief, was prominent among the Lakota.

Hunkpapa leader
In 1851, Running Antelope was elected one of four "shirt wearers" of the Húŋkpapȟa. A shirt wearer served to intercede between the council and the headmen and akíčhita who carried out tribal policy and decisions. He was a brave warrior and accomplished diplomat. A great council with the Sioux was called at Fort Laramie and Fort Rice in 1868. Running Antelope signed the Treaty of 1868 at Fort Rice. It was often said that Running Antelope was the greatest orator of the Sioux Nation. He attended the Fort Laramie, Fort Rice and Fort Peck treaty councils. Under the influence of James McLaughlin, he became a dominant leader of the reservation Hunkpapa people at the Grand River Agency. He was enrolled in 1868 at Grand River Agency, later part of Standing Rock Reservation in North and South Dakota. After the allotment period. Running Antelope established a settlement of about sixty families in the Grand River valley and opened a store. In his later years, he regretted signing the 1868 Treaty and longed for the time when the Lakota were free, and realigned with Sitting Bull. Late in 1880, the followers of Sitting Bull began to return from exile in Canada and in the spring of 1881, Running Antelope was enlisted as a scout in the army to go to Fort Buford to escort Gall and his followers to Standing Rock.

Last buffalo hunt
He was chosen to lead the last great Sioux buffalo hunt in June 1882. A large herd was sighted about a hundred miles west of Fort Yates, and a hunting of 2,000 men, women and children left the fort on June 10. The next morning the herd numbering approximately 50,000 buffalo was sighted and the hunt was on. About 2,000 were killed the first day, and the camp moved up to the scene of the hunt and the butchering began. The next day another 3,000 were killed and the camp settled in near a creek to jerk the meat and prepare pemmican. As usual when meat was plentiful, the labors of the Indian camp were lightened by feasting.

Later life

In 1899, Running Antelope was pictured on the Five-Dollar Silver Certificate. He died between June 30, 1896, and June 30, 1897. There have been multiple attempts to replace Andrew Jackson on the $20 bill with Running Antelope. He is buried at the Long Hill Cemetery east of Little Eagle, South Dakota.

On the 1885 Standing Rock ration list, he had ten lodges and 42 people in his care. Wahacanka Sapa (Black Shield); Mato Luta (Red Bear); Edwin Phelps Aknan Iyanke (Runs on It); Mato Hotanka (Loud Voice Bear); Rlaya Wakua (Chase Rattling); Winkta Yuza (Married to Hermaphrodite); Cante Witko (Fool Heart); Pte San Waste Win (Pretty Grey Cow); Tatanka He Ksa (Broken Horn Bull).

References

1821 births
1896 deaths
Lakota leaders
Hunkpapa people